The secret killings of Assam (1998–2001) was probably the darkest chapter in Assam's political history when relatives, friends, and sympathisers of ULFA insurgents were systematically killed by unknown assailants.
These extra-judicial murders happened in Assam between 1998 and 2001.

During the government of Asom Gana Parishad (AGP) leader Prafulla Kumar Mahanta, a number of family members of ULFA leaders were assassinated by unidentified gunmen. With the fall of this government following elections in 2001, the secret killings stopped. Investigations into the killings culminated in the report of the "Saikia Commission", presented to the Assam Assembly November 15, 2007. The report provides details about the killings, which were organized by Prafulla Mahanta in his role as the Assam Home Minister, and executed by the police, with cooperation from the Indian Army. The actual killers were surrendered elements of the ULFA, who would approach their targets at home, at night, knocking on the door and calling out in Assamese to allay suspicion. When the victims answered the door, they were shot or kidnapped to be shot elsewhere.
Chief Minister Tarun Gogoi in August 2005 constituted the Justice K N Saikia Commission of enquiry. The Commission submitted its Secret Killings of Assam's Report part by part and the action taken report was submitted on October 15, 2007, the digitized version of the report can be downloaded from Archive.org

See also
 Assam conflict
 Assamese Separatist Movement
 Assamese nationalism
 Kakopathar Massacre
 North-East India
 Operation All Clear

References

1998 establishments in Assam
2001 disestablishments in India
1998 murders in India
1999 murders in India
2000 murders in India
2001 murders in India
1990s in Assam
2000s in Assam
Assamese nationalism
Counterinsurgency
Politics of Assam
Terrorism in Assam
Political repression in India
Extrajudicial killings
Crimes committed by law enforcement